Angel City is an unincorporated community in Goliad County, in the U.S. state of Texas.

History
Some hold Angel City was named from frequent, violent brawls, while others believe two girls wearing white seemed angelic to an early visitor. Little remains of the original community.

References

Unincorporated communities in Goliad County, Texas
Unincorporated communities in Texas